Holy Unmercenaries is an epithet applied to a number of Christian saints who did not accept payment for good deeds. These include healers or Christian physicians who, in conspicuous opposition to medical practice of the day, tended to the sick free of charge.

List of Holy Unmercenaries 
Saints bearing this title include:

 Zenaida and Philonella
 Saint Tryphon
 Martyr Thalelaeus the Unmercenary, at Anazarbus in Cilicia (284)
 Saints Cosmas and Damian
 Saint Pantaleon, also called Saint Panteleimon
 Saints Cyrus and John
 Saint Diomedes of Tarsus
 Saint Sampson the Hospitable
 St Agapetus of the Kiev Caves (1095)
 St Luka Voyno-Yasenetsky (1961)
 Saint Blaise
 Blessed Matrona Nikonova

See also
 List of Eastern Orthodox saint titles
 List of Eastern Orthodox saints

References

 
Types of saints